Dana Welles Delany (born March 13, 1956) is an American actress. After appearing in small roles early in her career, Delany received her breakthrough role as Colleen McMurphy on the ABC television drama China Beach (1988–1991), for which she received the Primetime Emmy Award for Outstanding Lead Actress in a Drama Series in 1989 and 1992. She received further recognition for her appearances in the films Light Sleeper (1992), Tombstone (1993), Exit to Eden (1994), The Margaret Sanger Story (1995), Fly Away Home (1996), True Women (1997), and Wide Awake (1998). Delany is also a known voice actress, having voiced characters in the DC Animated Universe, notably as Andrea Beaumont in Batman: Mask of the Phantasm and Lois Lane in Superman: The Animated Series, Justice League and Justice League Unlimited, subsequently reprising the latter role in several projects unrelated to the DCAU. 

In the 2000s, Delany appeared in main roles on several short-lived television series, including Pasadena (2001), Presidio Med (2002–2003), and Kidnapped (2006–2007). From 2007 to 2010, she starred as Katherine Mayfair on the ABC television series Desperate Housewives, for which she received a Prism Award in 2009. Delany then starred as Megan Hunt on the ABC medical drama Body of Proof  (2011–2013), and as Crystal Harris on the Amazon Prime Video drama series Hand of God (2014–2017).

Early life
Delany was born in New York City, the daughter of Mary and Jack Delany. She has a sister, Corey, and a brother, Sean. She is of Irish and English descent and was raised Roman Catholic. She has stated that, even as a little girl, she always wanted to go into acting. "The reason a person first gets into acting is because you want attention from your parents as a little girl," she told a reporter. In her childhood, she went with her family to many Broadway shows and was fascinated by films.

After growing up in Stamford, Connecticut, she attended Phillips Academy in Andover, Massachusetts, for her senior year and was a member of the school's first co-educational class. Then-senior Delany wrote an op-ed in 1974 about her experience of being a one-year student during the school's first year of co-education. "Andover was the best time of my life," she recalled. She played the lead role of Nellie Forbush in the school's spring musical production of South Pacific opposite Peter Kapetan as Emile. She commented: "It was just a little awkward to be Nellie at first because she hesitates to marry Emile since he had once lived with a Polynesian woman – I don't agree with her reasoning so that made things a bit hard at the beginning." She appeared in a student video directed by classmate Jonathan Meath in a film class taught by Steve Marx. She graduated in 1974 with the academic honor of nomination to the school chapter of the Cum Laude Society, awarded that year to 80 out of 378 graduating seniors.

She majored in theater at Wesleyan University, where (among other productions) she appeared in one of the first performances of María Irene Fornés feminist play Fefu and Her Friends. Delany also worked summer stock productions during vacations before graduating in 1978. Later, in an interview, she reported that she sometimes had eating disorders during this time of her life. She said: "I binged... I starved ... I was one step from anorexia – a piece of toast and an apple would be all I would eat in a day."

Career

1980s: Stage, television, China Beach

After college, she found acting work in New York City in daytime soap operas including Love of Life and As the World Turns, and supported herself by acting in commercials such as for Wisk laundry detergent. She starred in the Broadway show A Life and won critical acclaim in 1983 in Nicholas Kazan's off-Broadway Blood Moon, where The New York Times cited her "skillful verisimilitude" handling a difficult part requiring two roles "and she does them both with authority." Delany moved to Hollywood and during the next few years found work guest starring in TV shows like Moonlighting and Magnum, P.I. and Thirtysomething.

Delany's first audition for the lead role of nurse Colleen McMurphy was unsuccessful. "They thought I wasn't pretty enough", she said in an interview. She finally won the role after she showed up to her next audition with her "long tresses cut into a bob" after the producers lost their first choice (she had cut her hair at the request of director Paul Schrader who had cast her in the film Patty Hearst). China Beach aired weekly from 1988 to 1991 and brought intense media attention to the actress. This role not only garnered two Primetime Emmy Awards, but two additional Primetime Emmy Award nominations and two Golden Globe Award nominations. The show ended after four seasons in 1991.

1990s: Movies, television, voice
In 1991, Delany was chosen by People magazine as one of the 50 most beautiful people in the world. In the years following China Beach, Delany worked steadily in television, movies and theater. In addition, she established herself as a significant voice talent.

Delany won leading roles in a string of feature films such as the TV movie A Promise to Keep, Light Sleeper, Housesitter and Fly Away Home as well as appearing in the TV mini-series Wild Palms. She also took on controversial roles, such as Mistress Lisa in Exit to Eden, where one film critic commented "The script was awful—Dana looked great." In 1992, she turned in her best known performance of the decade in the blockbuster Tombstone alongside Kurt Russell's Wyatt Earp, playing his love interest and future bride Josephine Marcus. 

Now a box office draw in her own right, the stage was set for the success she would encounter later in her career. Live Nude Girls included frank discussion by women of their sexual fantasies at a bachelorette party using a low-budget improvisational comedy format with strong chemistry between the actors. Reviews were mixed: Los Angeles Times critic Richard Natale liked the film but wrote older male film executives believed it to be "uncommercial"; another critic agreed it was "genuine girl talk" but "didn't have a lot of substance" and viewers "don't get to know the characters in the film". She also starred as Margaret Sanger in the TV movie Choices of the Heart: The Margaret Sanger Story (1995), about the controversial nurse who crusaded for women's reproductive rights in the early 1900s.

In 1995, Delany appeared in the Broadway show Translations and in May 1997, she returned to her alma mater Phillips Academy to work with theater students as an artist-in-residence. She appeared in TV movies such as True Women (1997) and Resurrection (1999).

In 1998, Delany reportedly turned down the role of Carrie Bradshaw in the hit TV show Sex and the City. She declined the role partly because of the negative audience reaction she received with a similar film, Exit to Eden, a few years prior. Sex and the City became a successful series, and the role of Carrie made Sarah Jessica Parker world-famous.

Delany played a gun-toting mother in an episode of the TV series Family Law (1999) for which she earned a Primetime Emmy Award nomination, but the series was not rerun due to sponsorship withdrawal.

Voice acting
Delany has performed substantial voice work. She portrayed Andrea Beaumont in the 1993 animated feature film Batman: Mask of the Phantasm based on the popular TV show Batman: The Animated Series. Delany's voice performance in the film impressed filmmakers and led to her being cast as Lois Lane in Superman: The Animated Series, interestingly like Andrea she also briefly dates Bruce Wayne in the crossover episode "World's Finest". She was also mentioned by name in one variation of the theme song of Animaniacs, another Warner Bros. production. She reprised her role as Lois Lane for the character's guest appearances in Justice League, Justice League Unlimited, and The Batman. She returned to the DC Universe in an episode of Batman: The Brave and the Bold as Vilsi, an alternate universe variation of Lois Lane. She reprised her role in the 2013 animated movie, Justice League: The Flashpoint Paradox.

2000s: Television, movies, stage, Desperate Housewives

Delany continued to find work in a variety of projects, doing pilots, TV series, made-for-TV movies, and feature films. She appeared in the NBC drama Good Guys/Bad Guys (2000), which Newsweek termed a "Sopranos knock-off". She appeared in the short-lived Pasadena (2001), a Fox production which was described as a "twisted rich-family saga" with a "great cast". Delany commented in an interview: "You can see Pasadena as a black comedy or see it as really tragic. A lot of soaps on television now don't have that layer of tragedy to them." She was an actor and co-executive producer of the film Final Jeopardy (2001). New York Daily News TV critic David Bianculli gave a positive review to both her performance as an actor—"Delany, as always, does pensive and independent better than most actresses"—and as a producer. She played a doctor in the TV series Presidio Med (2002), described as a "conventional but pleasant drama populated by characters dedicated to medicine who also have messy personal lives." She appeared in TV movies such as A Time to Remember (2003), and Baby for Sale (2004). She appeared in feature films by indie film producers, such as The Outfitters (1999), Mother Ghost (2002), and Spin (2003).

Returning to theater, she played an artsy and incompetent woman who questions the "imposed conventions of society" after discovering her husband's affair in the Pulitzer-prize winning Dinner With Friends (2000, New York City, Los Angeles, Boston); her performance earned positive reviews generally. She played Beatrice in Shakespeare's Much Ado About Nothing (2003, San Diego); one critic described the "verbal sparring" between Delany and actor Billy Campbell as a "joy".

From 2004 to 2006, Delany played many guest roles on TV shows, such as Law & Order: Special Victims Unit, Boston Legal, Kojak, Related, The L Word, and Battlestar Galactica. She also starred in the short-lived TV series Kidnapped (2006). One critic wrote "Delany is alternately furious and despondent as Ellie, and she and Hutton (Timothy Hutton) can do more without words than other actors can do with pages of dialogue. They're absolutely convincing as rich, complicated Manhattanites and as parents who come face to face with the scary reality that they can't always protect their kids."

Delany appeared as herself in the TV documentary Vietnam Nurses with Dana Delany which explored their lives and treatment after returning to the United States. Delany has become "something of a heroine to the nurses who served in Vietnam", according to Los Angeles Times writer Susan King, who noted that the actress worked on a nationwide nurse recruitment program in 1990 called the McMurphy project.

In 2007, Delany appeared in the films A Beautiful Life, Camp Hope, and Multiple Sarcasms.

Delany initially declined the offer to play one of the four Desperate Housewives principal characters, Bree Van De Kamp, saying it was too similar to her role on Pasadena. The show became a popular prime-time soap opera with substantial ratings. But in 2007 she was again offered a role by producer Marc Cherry, this time as a supporting housewife, and she joined the cast of the well-established series for the 2007–08 season. Reaction to the addition of Delany was positive; one critic wrote "...casting Dana Delany as Katherine Mayfair in Season 4 is one of the smartest things Cherry has ever done. Not many actors can deftly deliver both comedy and drama, but Delany makes it look easy." She commented about playing housewife Katherine Mayfair: "The hardest thing for me was figuring out the tone of the piece because it's such a specific tone – so it was more of an acting challenge than anything else." She commented in 2008: "I hope that she doesn't lose her snarkiness, because that's always fun to play." On May 13, 2008, it was announced that Delany would reprise her role on Desperate Housewives for season five, having been promoted to the sixth lead.

2010s: Television series and movies
In March 2010, Delany appeared as FBI agent Jordan Shaw in a two-part story on the TV series Castle, which stars Nathan Fillion, who played her character's second husband on Desperate Housewives.

Delany left Desperate Housewives to star in the new ABC series Body of Proof originally slated to begin airing in late 2010. Delany also voiced a character Margaret Rosenblatt in the film Firebreather in 2010.

In 2011, in Body of Proof, Delany played a brilliant neurosurgeon turned medical examiner after a car accident causes her to lose dexterity in her hands. Delany in real life had an experience similar to her character of Dr. Megan Hunt. Two weeks before filming the pilot episode, Delany's car was hit by a bus in Santa Monica; two fingers of her hand were broken and her car was totaled. Delany describes her character in Body of Proof as being "complicated, smart, and definitely complex."

In April 2011, Delany came 9th in People magazine's annual 100 Most Beautiful list.

In May 2011, Delany was the host of the fourth annual Television Academy Honors.

Delany appeared in the crime drama Freelancers with director Jessy Terrero. The film also stars Robert De Niro, Forest Whitaker, and 50 Cent.  It was released to DVD on August 21, 2012, and had a limited release in theatres in September.

In December 2016, Delany was the primetime guest host on Turner Classic Movies. She appeared in dozens of wraparounds on the channel, filling in for Robert Osborne.

Delany was cast for CBS's Drama The Code in August 2018.

Personal and public life

Delany was a member of the Hollywood Women's Political Committee. Since the mid-1990s, Delany has served on the board of the Scleroderma Research Foundation, and with her friend Sharon Monsky, she helped campaign for support in finding a cure for scleroderma. Working with director Bob Saget, she starred in the TV movie For Hope (1996) based on Saget's sister Gay, who had died as a result of the disease. She appeared as a contestant on Celebrity Jeopardy in 2001, 2006 and 2009 to raise money for scleroderma research. Scleroderma "robs these women of not only their own lives in many cases, but robs their families which include countless children," she explained in 2002.

Delany is a board member of the arts advocacy organization Creative Coalition. She appeared in June 2009 in an onstage meeting in New York alongside White House social secretary Desiree Rogers to discuss ways to promote American cinematic creativity. In August 2009, Delany was named co-president of the Creative Coalition, joining Tim Daly in the leadership of the organization. Delany explained her support for the arts in an interview: "I just think it's so important for children and the future of the country and people's general happiness. I'm one of those people who, whenever I feel cut off spiritually or emotionally, I go to a museum or a play or a movie, and I'm just transported." She participated as a celebrity guest in fundraising events that support the rights of same-sex couples to marry.

In addition, she has supported Planned Parenthood. She attended the organization's 90th birthday celebration in New York City in 2006. Delany said: "It's hard to imagine where we'd be in this country had Margaret Sanger not founded that first clinic here in New York, 90 years ago." She attended events sponsored by the Gay and Lesbian Alliance Against Defamation. She is a Democrat who campaigned for Hillary Clinton in 2016.

Delany has never been married nor had any children. She commented about her personal life in an interview in 2006: "I turned 50 and I'm ready to get married... I don't know who he is yet but I'm ready... He has to be smart, funny and kind." She added a year later: "Marriage has never been a big deal for me... But I think I'm ready now... I got to have all the fun in the world, to experience a lot of people and figure out what I really like." Delany (in 1988) said she doesn't find being a celebrity to be that appealing: "I'm not a 'personality'. I am never recognized, which I take as a compliment. I have a love-hate thing with publicity."

Delany, in 2003, tried having an injection of botox in her forehead, but the needle hit a nerve and created a bruise that affected the muscle in her right eye, causing it to droop slightly. In 2010, she vowed she would never have plastic surgery. She told Prevention in 2010 that she prefers eating healthily, including vegetables, tofu, fish, gluten-free pasta, and bread.

In April 2011, Delany came 9th in People magazine's annual 100 Most Beautiful list.

In 2019, Delany commented on her approach to acting:

Filmography

Awards and nominations

General source for awards:

Additional sources—Family Law: Prism: Screen Actors Guild: Lone Star Film & Television:  TV Land:

References

External links

 
 
 
 
 
 
 
 
 
 

1956 births
Living people
20th-century American actresses
21st-century American actresses
Actresses from Connecticut
American film actresses
American health activists
American people of English descent
American people of Irish descent
American soap opera actresses
American stage actresses
American television actresses
American voice actresses
Outstanding Performance by a Lead Actress in a Drama Series Primetime Emmy Award winners
Phillips Academy alumni
Wesleyan University alumni
Actresses from New York City
Actresses from Los Angeles
Actresses from Stamford, Connecticut
New York (state) Democrats
Connecticut Democrats
California Democrats
American Roman Catholics